SM UB-55 was a German Type UB III submarine or U-boat in the German Imperial Navy during World War I. She was commissioned into the Flanders Flotilla of the German Imperial Navy on 1 July 1917 as SM UB-55.

She operated as part of the Flanders Flotilla based in Zeebrugge. UB-55 was sunk at 05:05 on 22 April 1918 at  after striking a mine, 30 crew members lost their lives in the event.

Construction

She was built by AG Weser, Bremen and following just under a year of construction, launched at Bremen on 9 May 1917. UB-55 was commissioned later that same year under the command of Kptlt. Ralph Wenninger. Like all Type UB III submarines, UB-55 carried 10 torpedoes and was armed with a  deck gun. UB-55 had a displacement of  while surfaced and  when submerged. Her engines enabled her to travel at  when surfaced and  when submerged.

Summary of raiding history

References

Notes

Citations

Bibliography 

 

German Type UB III submarines
World War I submarines of Germany
U-boats commissioned in 1917
Maritime incidents in 1918
U-boats sunk in 1918
World War I shipwrecks in the English Channel
U-boats sunk by mines
1917 ships
Ships built in Bremen (state)